The 2022–23 Southeastern Louisiana Lady Lions basketball team represents Southeastern Louisiana University in the 2022–23 NCAA Division I women's basketball season. The Lady Lions are led by sixth-year head coach Ayla Guzzardo, and play their home games at University Center as members of the Southland Conference.

Previous season
The Lady Lions finished the 2021–22 season 16–11 overall, 10–4 in Southland play to finish in third place. They defeated Texas A&M-Corpus Christi in the first round of the Southland women's tournament.  Their season ended when they were defeated by Incarnate Word in the finals.

Media
Home games are broadcast on ESPN+.

Preseason polls

Southland Conference Poll
The Southland Conference released its preseason poll on October 25, 2022. Receiving 3 first place votes and 122 votes overall, the Lady Lions were picked to finish third in the conference.

Preseason All Conference
Hailey Giaratano was selected as a member of the second team for the third time.

Roster

Schedule and results

|-
!colspan=9 style=| Non-conference regular season

|-
!colspan=9 style=| Southland Conference regular season

|-
!colspan=9 style=| 2023 Jersey Mike's Subs Southland Basketball Tournament
|-

|-
!colspan=9 style=| NCAA Tournament
|-

Source:

See also
 2022–23 Southeastern Louisiana Lions basketball team

References

Southeastern Louisiana Lady Lions basketball seasons
Southeastern Louisiana University
Southeastern Louisiana University basketball
Southeastern Louisiana University basketball
Southeastern Louisiana